Win Myint (born 8 November 1951) is a Burmese politician who served as the tenth president of Myanmar from 2018 to 2021. He was removed from office in the 2021 military coup d'état. He was the Speaker of the House of Representatives of Myanmar from 2016 to 2018. He also served as a member of parliament in the House of Representatives (Pyithu Hluttaw) from 2012 to 2018. Win Myint was viewed as an important ally and placeholder for State Counsellor Aung San Suu Kyi, who served as the actual head of government but was constitutionally barred from the presidency.

Early life and education
Win Myint was born in Nyaung Chaung Village, Danubyu, Ayeyarwady Region, Burma to parents Tun Kyin and Daw Than. He graduated with a Bachelor of Science degree in geology from the Rangoon Arts and Science University. He is married to Cho Cho and the couple has one daughter, Phyu Phyu Thin, a senior advisor of City Mart Holdings.

Political career

1988 uprising and 1990 election
After graduating in geology from Rangoon Arts and Science University, Win Myint became a High Court senior lawyer in 1981 and become a lawyer of the Supreme Court of Myanmar. In 1985, he became a High Court advocate. He was jailed for his role in the 8888 Uprising, and has been described by some who have met him as rather a closed book.

Out of jail in time for the 1990 Myanmar general election, which the military later nullified, he ran successfully for Ayeyarwady Region’s Danubyu Township, winning a majority of 20,388 (56% of the votes), but was never allowed to assume his seat.

2012 by-election and 2015 election
He resumed his political career in the 2012 Myanmar by-elections, winning a Pyithu Hluttaw, lower house seat in Pathein constituency, and going on to become secretary of parliament’s rule of law committee. In the 2015 Myanmar general election, he was elected as Pyithu Hluttaw MP for Tamwe Township. He served as the Speaker of the House of Representatives of Myanmar from 2016 to 2018.

Presidency
Following the resignation of Htin Kyaw as President of Myanmar, Win Myint resigned as Speaker of the Pyithu Hluttaw on 21 March 2018, a move seen by many as a preparation by the National League for Democracy for Win Myint to be put forward as a candidate for the presidency. He was succeeded by his deputy T Khun Myat. The Pyithu Hluttaw confirmed the election of Win Myint as the House of Representatives' nominee for vice president on 23 March 2018, paving the way for Win Myint to enter the election process for the next President of Myanmar. He defeated Union Solidarity and Development Party's candidate Thaung Aye with 273 votes to the latter's 27. Win Myint was elected as the 10th President of Myanmar by the Pyidaungsu Hluttaw (a combined meeting of the two houses of the national legislature) on 28 March 2018, with 403 out of 636 lawmakers voting for him.

On 17 April 2018, Win Myint granted amnesty to 8,500 prisoners, including 51 foreigners and 36 political prisoners.

On 1 February 2021, Win Myint was detained by military along with fellow parliament members including the Democratic party leader, Aung Sun Suu Kyi in Naypyidaw city. His presidency was removed by military dictator lead, Min Aung Hlaing and replaced with vice-president, Myint Swe.

Later on 4 February 2021, Win Myint was charged two-weeks custody for violating rules banning gatherings during the COVID-19 pandemic. Trial hearings commenced on 16 February. On 11 October, a Naypyidaw judge formally indicted Win Myint under Section 25 of the Disaster Management Law, which carries a maximum three-year prison sentence. During Win Myint's testimony on 12 October, he revealed that on 1 February in the lead-up to the coup, two senior military generals had attempted to force him to resign, under the guise of "ill health."

On 6 December 2021, Win Myint and Suu Kyi were both sentenced to 4 years in jail.

See also

Notes

References

Members of Pyithu Hluttaw
Speakers of the House of Representatives of Myanmar
National League for Democracy politicians
Prisoners and detainees of Myanmar
1951 births
Living people
Leaders ousted by a coup
People from Ayeyarwady Region
University of Yangon alumni
Presidents of Myanmar